Radomir Damnjanović Damnjan (Mostar, 10 December 1935) is a Serbian painter and conceptual artist. He lives and works in Milan and Belgrade.

Biography 
He graduated on the Academy of Fine Arts in Belgrade in 1957, a post-graduate studies 1959. First time he exhibiting in Belgrade in 1958, and in numerous group exhibitions at home and abroad take part from 1959. He exhibited in The Documents in Kassel (1964), biennials in São Paulo (1963), Venice (1966, 1976), Tokyo (1967) and Bratislava (1968). As a Fulbright scholar was in Los Angeles and New York in 1971-1972. From 1974 he had lived in Milan.

Art 
Damnjan deals with painting, drawing, graphics, photography, film, video and performance. During the sixties, early in his career, Damnjan the painter symbolic, abstract and minimal features. Since the seventies he used to the new media - video, photography and performance, while the painting closer to its analytical stream. At the turn of the ninth decade of the last century, the theme turns Damnjan 'still life' and '(self)portraits' which implements a floor or wall installations painted in the spirit of postmodern citation as 'new pointillism'.

Solo exhibitions (selection) 
 1958 Graphic Collective Gallery, Belgrade
 1962 Museum of Contemporary Art, Belgrade, Studio G, Salon Wider, Zagreb
 1966 Gallery of Contemporary Art, Zagreb
 1967 Obere Zaun Galerie, Zurich
 1968 Galerie im Zimmertheater, Tübingen
 1969 Small Gallery, Ljubljana
 1970 Salon at the Museum of Contemporary Art, Skopje, Museum of Contemporary Art, Belgrade, Gallery of Contemporary Art, Zagreb
 1973 Gallery of Student Cultural Center, Belgrade
 1974 Student Centre Gallery, Zagreb, Studio Carla Ortelli, Milan
 1975 Multhipla Galleria, Milano, Museum of Contemporary umetnosi, Belgrade
 1976 Galleria Stefanon, Lecco
 1977 Studio 16/e, Turin, Galleria Civica, Modena, Galleria Performing Arts Center, Genova, Gallery Nova, Zagreb
 1978 Pilot Galleria, Milan
 1979 Gastaldello Galleria, Milan, Kunsthalle, Tübingen
 1981 Gallery of Contemporary Art, Zagreb
 1982 Art Gallery, Milan
 1985 Galerie Ingrid Dacić, Tübingen
 1986 Museum of Contemporary Art, Retrospective Exhibition, Belgrade
 1987 Modern Art, the Museum of Contemporary Art, Skopje
 1992 Gallery kulurnog Student Center, Belgrade
 1996 Fondazione balls, Milan
 1997 Art Pavilion Cvijeta Zuzoric, Belgrade, Center for Visual Culture, Novi Sad
 1999 Galerie Peter Lindner, Vienna
 2006 Federico Bianchi Contemporary Art, Lecco

Actions 
 1965 Overflowing of the river Sava, Belgrade
 1974 Free artwork, The Gallery of Student Cultural Center, Belgrade, Disinformation, Cinema Balkans, Zagreb
 1989 Flame Pyramid, Stazione di Lambro, Milan, Pyramid of cabbage, Esplanade Hotel, room 321, Zagreb
 1993 Natura morta, Fondazione Mudima, Milan
 1995 The Great Pyramid of cabbage, Anker House Gallery, Belgrade

Performances 
 1973 The man from the newspaper or the ability to communicate, 12 min. Gallery of Student Cultural Center, Belgrade
 1975 Identity - the destruction of books, Marx, Hegel and the Bible, 25 min. Trigon '75, Graz
 1976 Dinner with Terry Doxey from London, 30 min. Gallery of Student Cultural Center, Belgrade
 1978 From labor to creative work, 25 min, Gallery of Student Cultural Center, Belgrade, from labor to creative work, 30 min. Gallery of Contemporary Art, Zagreb
 1979 From labor to creativity (version II), 30 min. Gallery of Student Cultural Center, Belgrade, Dal Lavoro allacreatività, 25 min. Studio 16/e, Torino
 1982 Grande natura morta, 25 min. Il Festival Internazionale d'Arte Video, Locarno, From Work to creativeness, The 4th Biennial of Sydney, Vision in Disbelief, Sydney
 1986 Large Still Life, April meetings, Gallery of Student Cultural Center, Belgrade
 1996 Chattanooga Choo Choo and the United Belgrade Still Life, Die Weise stadt, Museum Moderne Kunst Stiftung Ludwig, Vienna
 1997 Record of a portrait - Ješa Denegri, Gallery Zvono, Belgrade

Movies 
 1973 The man from the newspaper, 8 mm, b/w, 3 min.
 1974 Bandiera, super 8 mm, color, sound, 11 min., Per il Futuro, Super 8 mm, color, 10 min.

Video 
 1975 Identity - the destruction of the books of Marx, Hegel and the Bible, b/w, 20 min. PAL, sound, Trigon '75, Graz
 1976 Daily ritual of coffee drinking, 30 min, b/w, 3/4 inches, PAL, sound, Reading the same text, b/w, 20 min, 3/4 inches, PAL, sound, Reading Marx, Hegel and the Bible in the light of a matches, b/w, 30 min, 3/4 inches, PAL, sound, Spot in space or position of individuals in society, b/w, 30 min, 3/4 inches, PAL, sound, Tübingen
 1977 Movement as a general need, 26 min, b/w, 3/4 inches, PAL, sound, Revolution as a game of minorities, 17 min, b/w, PAL, sound, Tübingen
 1982 Great still life, 25 min, color, 3/4 inches, PAL, sound, Locarno
 1983 Metaphysical Duchamp, Video D.C. 83, Ljubljana

Books (selection) 
 Gillo Dorfles, Ultima Tendenze nell'arte d'oggi, Feltrinelli, Milan, 1973, p. 149
 Achille Bonito Oliva, Europe - America, The different Avantgardes, Decco Press, Milan, 1976, p. 126
 Gillo Dorfles, La body art, l'arte moderna, Fratelli Fabbri, Milan, 1977, p. 225
 Ješa Denegri, 10 Years Autumn Styring, Paul Kaufman, Graz, 1978, p. 171
 Radomir Damnjan, Niente di nello spirito superfluo, Edition Dacić, Tübingen, 1978
 Rafel Tous and Giner, Metronome, Libres d'Artista/Artist's Books, Berlin, Barcelona, 1981, p. 194

Awards 
 1963 Award 'Wanda Svevo', 7th Biennial in São Paulo, São Paulo
 1968 Awards on International Biennial 'Danubius '68', Bratislava
 1981 Award Il Festival di arte video, Arte Video in Europa, Locarno

See also
 List of painters from Serbia

Sources 
 Documentation of the Museum of Contemporary art, Belgrade
 Radomir Damnjanović Damnjan, monograph, Collection Vujičić, Belgrade, 2010 

1935 births
Serbian painters
Living people